The 37th FIE Fencing World Cup began in October 2007 and concluded in August 2008 at the 2008 Summer Olympics in Beijing.

Individual Épée

Individual Foil

Individual Sabre

Team Épée

Team Foil

Team Sabre

References 
 FIE rankings

Fencing World Cup
2007 in fencing
2008 in fencing
International fencing competitions hosted by China
2008 in Chinese sport